Paralicornia obtecta is a species of bryozoan, found in Australian waters. It has an avicularium with three protrusions, a feature also found in Paralicornia hamata and Paralicornia sinuosa.

References

Cheilostomatida